Nayakan is a 2010 Indian Malayalam-language crime film directed by Lijo Jose Pellissery and written by P. S. Rafeeque. It stars Indrajith Sukumaran, Thilakan, Jagathy Sreekumar, Dhanya Mary Varghese and Siddique. The film revolves around a Kathakali artist, Vardanunni, who joins the underworld to take revenge on those who killed his family and destroyed his life.

Plot 
Vardanunni is the son of famous Kathakali artist Ramankutty Ashan (master). Ashan's dream was to make his son also a famous Kathakali artist. But Varadanunni, having seen that his dad could not earn anything from his art, decides to go to Bangalore after he gets a job. His father insists that Varadan should come with them to Mumbai for a Kathakali performance but Varadan defies his father and goes to Bangalore to take up his new job.

In Mumbai, Ramankutty and his daughter happen to witness the murder of a popular politician at the hands of a famous magician turned underworld don Shankar Das (alias JS). The wicked Sankar Das kills Ramankutty and his daughter to eliminate all proof of the murder. But Ramankutty had called Nambeesan (his close confidante) on his mobile before this and informed that he saw Sankar Das murdering the politician. When Varadan comes back from Bangalore, he gets to know from Nambeesan that his family has been murdered by JS.

Varadan goes to meet Sankar Das and tries to beat him up in anger. But he gets arrested and gets beaten up badly. He is rescued by Karanavar, another underworld kingpin. Karanavar's son was killed by Shankar Das and so he also has a score to settle with JS.

Together they decide to take revenge against JS and with clever tactics - by sowing the seeds of mistrust between his business associates Thomas Brothers and Douglas - as part of the plan, Thomas Brothers are killed and Douglas is left with the option of making a truce with Karanavar. Advocate Sreenivasan, J.S's legal attorney betrays him and has J.S brought to a deserted Island - following the instructions of Karanavar and Varadan, utilising Douglas as a bait. Karanavar fires six bullets at point blank range piercing J.S's forehead - while the latter is tied to an old anchor. Before being killed, Shankar Das warns Karanavar about an imminent resurrection.

Cast 
 Indrajith Sukumaran as Varadanunni
 Thilakan as Vincent Karanavar/ Vincent Vadakkan
 Siddique as Shankar Das alias J.S. / Ram Das
 Jagathy Sreekumar as Nambeeshan
 Dhanya Mary Varghese as Mariya, Vincent Karanavar's daughter
 Kalashala Babu as Ramankutty Aashan
 Vijayaraghavan as William Thomas
 Lalu Alex as Rajagopal
 Sreejith Ravi as James
 Anil Murali as Francis
 Salu K George
 Shivaj
 Ambika Mohan as Vincent Karanavar's wife/Mariya's mother
 Chemban Vinod Jose as Saravanan
 Lijo Jose Pellissery as Steve

Reception 
The film mostly received positive reviews from critics. Veeyen of Nowrunning.com rated the film  and wrote: "Nayakan is an exceptionally polished film, a strange combine of a creepy drama and a jet-black thriller that gradually builds to an almost chimerical climax." The reviewer was all praise for the technical parts of the film. He writes: "The non-intrusive background score and a remarkable musical score by Prashant Pillai that gels adeptly with the murky mood of the film gets under your skin as much as the film does. Manoj Paramahamsa's camera is nothing short of savage, and probes into every nook and corner when it's not lurking around unnoticed." The critic appreciates the direction writing: "'Nayakan' would have ended up as another routine study on the spirit of retribution, had it not had an enterprising director at its helm. Lijo makes an imposing debut with the film that prickles our senses with plenty of smart moments." Paresh C Palicha of Rediff.com wrote: "There are films that pleasantly surprise you in times when originality goes for a toss. One such film is Nayakan, a Malayalam film that not only grabs your attention by its originality of premise or treatment, but by its sincerity as well." A critic from Sify.com commented: "There have been not many films in Malayalam during recent times that make such an impact in the viewer's mind as debutant director Lijo Jose Pellissery's Nayakan." Oneindia.in's reviewer said: "Nayakan is an extra ordinary one with a new impact on the audience."

References

External links 

2010 films
2010s Malayalam-language films
2010 crime films
Films about organised crime in India
Indian gangster films
Indian crime films
Indian films about revenge
2010 directorial debut films
Films directed by Lijo Jose Pellissery